From the introduction of TOPS in 1973, all British Rail diesel and electric locomotives and multiple units were allocated to a particular traction maintenance depot or TMD. Drawing from the terminology of steam traction, these depots were generally referred to as "sheds", and indeed most locations were those which had possessed depots for steam locos. Each TMD had a two-character code which was originally displayed underneath the number of each locomotive allocated there. Later this was extended to cover each carriage of diesel multiple units (DMUs), and even some coaching stock; at this time additional depot codes were added covering places with coaching stock allocations, and also works locations.

Allocations and TOPS depot codes

Locations given a TOPS code included all TMDs, servicing depots (where minor work such as A exams could be undertaken), and some stabling points (SPs) where locomotives or multiple units would be parked when not required. The locations varied from comprehensively equipped depots, through covered accommodation with fuelling point, to a mere siding. The use of TOPS codes for SPs was somewhat haphazard, with Machynlleth (code MN) hosting one or two locomotives on some weekends while Wolverhampton station, which had no TOPS code, stabled more than a dozen locos.

The application of a depot code was generally reliable as a guide to the base from which the locomotive or multiple unit operated but with some variations, mainly relating to shunters and departmental locomotives.

EMU depots such as Birkenhead North (BD) often required a diesel shunter for moving stock when not powered. As there was no fuelling or maintenance capability at BD, a shunter allocated to nearby Birkenhead Mollington Street (BC) was used, returning to its home depot every four weeks. This arrangement also existed at other locations such as Ilford/Stratford.

Departmental locomotives, by the nature of their use, were sometimes reported as allocated to a base location or even to a region in general rather than an official depot. The Western Region sometimes followed this practice, with number 20 (latterly 97020) reported as allocated to "Reading Signal Works" throughout the 1970s. Locomotives used for research purposes would be reported as allocated to the Derby Research Centre.

List of TMD, Servicing Depot, SP and other non-works codes

Works codes

References

Sources
 

British Railways shed codes
 
British Rail infrastructure
TOPS depot codes